Julie King (born May 26, 1982), known as Yulianna, is a Russian American vocalist. She achieved popularity in the early 2000s by combining classical training with mainstream pop music, and her song "Don't Take Your Love Away" charted at number 49 on the Billboard Dance/Club Songs Chart in 2013. Yulianna has been credited with coining the term popra for the combination of pop and opera.

Early life and training
Born in Almaty, Kazakhstan, in the former Soviet Union, Yulianna was trained as a vocalist and violinist. She grew up in Santa Barbara, California, and earned a master's degree at the California Institute for the Arts before moving to Los Angeles to pursue a career in entertainment.

Yulianna's early career included vocal training with Russian opera singer Vladimir Chernov (now a music professor at the University of California, Los Angeles) and the composer Daniel Catán.

Career
In 2009, Yulianna met with music producer Robin Nixon, and the two went on to produce her first album, La-La-Land.

In 2012, she released her first single, "Race Car", with help from Nixon. "Race Car" was generally well received by critics, and the music video, directed by Waleed Moursi, won Best Music Video at the 2012 Colorado Film Festival.

Yulianna's first hit was "Forgiveness", a collaboration with Walter Afanasieff. The song and video garnered over a million views on YouTube. It was submitted for Best Instrumental Arrangement Accompanying Vocalist for the 55th Annual Grammy Awards in 2012. The video won several awards, including Best Music Video at the Naperville Film Festival and the Las Vegas Film Festival.

In 2013, Yulianna released her first full-length dance album, Californ-i-a, written and produced with RAS and Spencer Nezey. Californ-i-a was well received by critics and was distributed internationally. The single "Don't Take Your Love Away" remixed by Excel Beats and Erik Mota reached the Top 50 Billboard chart.

Yulianna's most recent album, Popra Soldier, was released in 2014, with Ruslan Sirota as the featured piano player.

References

1982 births
Living people
20th-century American singers
21st-century American singers
American women pop singers
American women rock singers
American women singer-songwriters
American rock songwriters
American film actresses
American music industry executives
California Institute of the Arts alumni
People from Almaty
20th-century American women singers
21st-century American women singers
American singer-songwriters